Kozbekçi Mustafa Ağa, known as Mustapha Aga in Sweden, was an Ottoman ambassador to the Swedish court in 1727. One of his missions was to obtain a repayment of a royal debt which had been incurred by Charles XII of Sweden, but he failed in his mission. He was painted smoking nargile by George Engelhardt Schroeder (1684–1750).

He was succeeded by Yirmisekizzade Mehmed Said Efendi in his role as ambassador.

Notes

References
 Colin Imber, Keiko Kiyotaki, Rhoads Murphey Frontiers of Ottoman studies: state, province, and the West I.B.Tauris, 2005 

Ambassadors of the Ottoman Empire to Sweden
Political people from the Ottoman Empire
Year of birth missing
Year of death missing
18th-century people from the Ottoman Empire
18th-century diplomats